Ward County is a county located in the U.S. state of Texas.  As of the 2020 census, its population was 11,644. The county seat is Monahans. The county was created in 1887 and organized in 1892. It is named for Thomas W. Ward, a soldier in the Texas Revolution.

History

Native Americans

Archeological investigations conducted in northwestern Ward County have found evidence of prehistoric man in the form of occupational debris, petroglyphs, and pictographs.  Tribes occupying the area include Suma-Jumano, Apache, and Comanche. The sand hills have contained native artifacts.

Growth

The Butterfield Overland Mail in 1858 used Emigrant's Crossing, where exposed rocks afford one of the few places safe for fording the Pecos River. The stage line had an adobe station and a high-walled adobe corral there.

In 1881, the Texas and Pacific Railway crossed the region and established stations at Sand Hills, Monahans, Aroya, Pyote, Quito, Quito Quarry, and Barstow.

The Texas State Legislature carved Ward County from a portion of Tom Green County in 1887.  The county was organized in 1892. Barstow became the county seat.  Barstow became a farming and ranching trade center by 1904. Drought plagued the area in the early part of the 20th century.

Ward County benefitted from the opening of the Hendrick oilfield Winkler County in 1926. Pipelines and railroad loading tanks were constructed at Wickett, Pyote, and Monahans. Oil was discovered at Grandfalls  in 1929, and the nearby community of Royalty was established.  Shell Oil Company constructed an  tank that would hold a million barrels. By January 1, 1991,  of oil had been produced in the county since 1928.

On May 10, 1938, Monahans won a contested election to move the county seat from Barstow. The election was upheld in 1939, and the county seat moved to Monahans that year.

Pyote Air Force Station  opened in 1942, becoming the largest bomber installation in the United States.  The plane Enola Gay, which dropped the atomic bomb on Hiroshima, was later stored here.  The base became inactive during the Korean War.

Monahans Sandhills State Park opened in 1957.  The Sealy-Smith Foundation leased much of the land to the state in 1956 until 2056.  An additional  were leased from the Williams family of Monahans.

Geography

Major highways
  Interstate 20
  State Highway 18
  State Highway 115
  State Highway 329

Adjacent counties
 Winkler County (north)
 Ector County (northeast)
 Crane County (east)
 Pecos County (south)
 Reeves County (west)
 Loving County (northwest)

Demographics

Note: the US Census treats Hispanic/Latino as an ethnic category. This table excludes Latinos from the racial categories and assigns them to a separate category. Hispanics/Latinos can be of any race.

As of the census of 2000,  10,909 people, 3,964 households, and 2,929 families were residing in the county.  The population density was 13 people per square mile (5/km2).  The 4,832 housing units averaged 6 per sq mi (2/km2).  The racial makeup of the county was 79.79% White, 4.61% African American, 0.66% Native American, 0.28% Asian,  12.55% from other races, and 2.11% from two or more races. About 41.98% of the population were Hispanics or Latinos of any race.

Of the 3,964 households, 36.60% had children under the age of 18 living with them, 58.80% were married couples living together, 11.60% had a female householder with no husband present, and 26.10% were not families. About 23.60% of all households were made up of individuals, and 12.30% had someone living alone who was 65 years of age or older.  The average household size was 2.66, and the average family size was 3.15.

In the county, the age distribution was 30.60% under 18, 7.80% from 18 to 24, 25.10% from 25 to 44, 22.20% from 45 to 64, and 14.30% who were 65 or older.  The median age was 36 years. For every 100 females, there were 99.80 males.  For every 100 females age 18 and over, there were 92.30 males.

The median income for a household in the county was $29,386, and for a family was $36,014. Males had a median income of $31,373 versus $18,198 for females. The per capita income for the county was $14,393.  About 15.80% of families and 17.90% of the population were below the poverty line, including 20.30% of those under age 18 and 20.10% of those age 65 or over.

Government and infrastructure
An unincorporated area near Pyote is the site of the former Pyote Air Force Base. The facility housed the West Texas State School, operated by the Texas Youth Commission, until the youth detention facility closed in 2010.

Politics

Communities

Cities
 Barstow
 Monahans (county seat)

Towns
 Grandfalls
 Pyote
 Thorntonville
 Wickett

Census-designated place
 Southwest Sandhill

Unincorporated community
 Royalty

Ghost town
 Three Corner Windmill

See also

 Recorded Texas Historic Landmarks in Ward County

References

External links
 Ward County government's website
 
 Historic Ward County materials, hosted by the Portal to Texas History.

 
1887 establishments in Texas